Maria Faust (born 18 April 1979) is an Estonian jazz saxophonist. She has worked with John Parish and Mark Howard. She frequently tours in western Europe and has  performanced in the Balkan Peninsula, South America, China, and Russia.

Galleri

Awards and honors
 BMW Welt Jazz Awards nominee 2019
 Nominated to Danish Music Awards 2018 in category "Composer of the year" (Maria Faust Machina)
 Winner of Danish critics price "Steppeulven 2018" in category "Composer of the year" (Kira Skov/Maria Faust In the Beginning)
 Multiple winner of Danish Music Awards 2017 in categories "Jazz composer of the year" and "Vocal Jazz album of the year" (Kira Skov/Maria Faust "In the Beginning")
 Danske Jazz Award Jazzkaar 2016
 Minister of the Danish Culture Niels Mattiasen's Mindelegat 2016
 Multiple winner of Danish Music Awards 2014 in categories "Jazz Composer of the Year" and "Cross over album of the year" 2014 (Maria Faust Sacrum Facere)
 Nominated to Estonian Music Awards in category "Jazz Album of the Year " in 2014 and 2015
 Nominated to Danish Music Awards 2013 in category " Composer of the year" (Maria Faust Jazz Catastrope)

Discography
 Bitchslap Boogie (Barefoot, 2008)
 Warrior Horse (Barefoot, 2010)
 Maria Faust Jazz Catastrophe (Barefoot, 2013)
 Maria Faust Sacrum Facere (Barefoot, 2014)
 In the Beginning (Stunt, 2017)
 Machina (Stunt, 2018)
 Farm Fresh (Gotta Let It Out, 2019)
 Organ (Stunt, 2020)

References

1979 births
Living people
21st-century Estonian musicians
Estonian Academy of Music and Theatre alumni
Estonian choral conductors
Estonian expatriates in Denmark
Estonian women musicians
Estonian musicians
People from Kuressaare